The Gulf Wind was a streamlined passenger train inaugurated on July 31, 1949, as a joint operation by the Louisville and Nashville Railroad and the Seaboard Air Line Railroad (Seaboard Coast Line after merger with the Atlantic Coast Line on July 1, 1967).  The Gulf Wind replaced the heavyweight New Orleans - Florida Express on this routing. The Gulf Wind was a limited stops train and offered amenities such as dining cars and Pullman service. The train left Jacksonville at night and arrived in New Orleans in the evening, as the Express had done. 

Prior to the establishment of the Gulf Wind the New Orleans-Florida Express had a counterpart train, the New Orleans-Florida Limited, which left Jacksonville in the morning. For much of the twentieth century, one or two other passenger trains, numbered but unnamed, also plied this route daily; these were much-slower local trains, stopping at each small town along the route, and were labeled simply as "passenger, mail, and express" in timetables. The Express, contrary to its name, made stops at small towns; while the Gulf Wind made fewer stops, mainly in larger towns and cities.

Route
The train's 617-mile route ran from Jacksonville, Florida via Tallahassee, Chattahoochee, Pensacola, Flomaton, Mobile, and Biloxi to New Orleans.  Locomotives were changed at Chattahoochee, where the SAL rails met those of the L&N.

With a schedule designed for passengers changing to or from the Seaboard's Silver Meteor at Jacksonville, the Gulf Wind originally departed both endpoints at 5 p.m. daily for the overnight run across the Florida Panhandle and along the Gulf Coast, arriving in the morning at the other end of the line.  The name was likely inspired by the success of another train carried partly over L&N rails, the Chicago-Miami South Wind.

Heading westbound, the Gulf Wind joined onto Louisville & Nashville's Pan-American at Flomaton, Alabama.  On the eastbound trip, the Gulf Wind ran from New Orleans to Flomaton along with the Southern Railway's Piedmont Limited, and at Flomaton departed as its own train. After the Southern Railway discontinued the Piedmont Limited, the Pan-American carried the Gulf Wind in both directions from New Orleans to Flomaton.

Equipment
The consist of the Gulf Wind included baggage cars, coaches, and Pullman sleepers with a mix of rooms and traditional open sections, as well as an L&N diner between New Orleans and Mobile, and an SAL diner between Chattahoochee and Jacksonville. By 1955 modern roomettes were added to the consist. A round-ended observation car was also a regular part of the Gulf Wind consist.

In December 1967, the first winter season of the merged Seaboard Coast Line Railroad, the train was the last, along with the company's Silver Star, to have open section sleepers, along with roomettes and other rooms. By the December 1968 schedule, the L&N and the SCL had dropped sleepers from the Gulf Wind altogether.

History
Passenger service existed on this route from its construction in 1882 by the Pensacola and Atlantic Railroad, at times with three or four daily trains in each direction.  In 1949, the L&N and the SAL had a local train that arrived at its destinations in the early evening. This local train had no diner or lounge; besides coaches, it carried just baggage and mail cars. (The local train's predecessor, the New Orleans-Florida Express, had a dining car and sleeping cars.) The local was eliminated in 1966. In the train's final year, from 1970 to April 1971, the L&N and Seaboard Coast Line made the Gulf Wind a three departures a week train.

The last run of the Gulf Wind occurred on April 30, 1971. Amtrak, which took over nearly all passenger train operations in the United States on the following day, elected not to continue running the Gulf Wind, which despite good equipment and service was not a profitable train at that point in time.

The western portion of the Gulf Wind route from Mobile to New Orleans was briefly served by Amtrak's Gulf Coast Limited from 1984 to 1985, and again from 1996 to 1997.

The Gulf Wind route had no scheduled passenger train service between Jacksonville and Flomaton until the revived and extended tri-weekly Sunset Limited was inaugurated by Amtrak in 1993. The service was again suspended in 2005 when Hurricane Katrina did extensive damage to the Gulf Coast.  Passenger service had not resumed . In 2016 and 2017 Gulf Coast regional officials agitated for restoration of daily train service between New Orleans and Florida.

See also
 Pensacola and Atlantic Railroad - predecessor of the L&N

References

External links
Running The Coast, The Joint Seaboard/L&N, Gulf Wind
The Gulf Winds timetable and consist, November, 1949
The Gulf Winds final timetable and consist, January - April, 1971
West Florida Railroad Museum, Milton, Fla.
Heritage Museum of Northwest Florida, Valparaiso, Fla.
Pictures of the restored L&N observation car Royal Street, used on the Gulf Wind until 1970
More pictures of the Royal Street, now in private hands

Named passenger trains of the United States
Passenger trains of the Louisville and Nashville Railroad
Passenger trains of the Seaboard Air Line Railroad
Passenger trains of the Seaboard Coast Line Railroad
Night trains of the United States
Passenger rail transportation in Alabama
Passenger rail transportation in Florida
Passenger rail transportation in Louisiana
Passenger rail transportation in Mississippi
Railway services introduced in 1949
Railway services discontinued in 1971